Keeling is an unincorporated area in Pittsylvania County, Virginia.

History
On August 28, 2019, three people were found shot to death in a house on Keeling Drive: the suspect's mother, 62; sister, 25; and sister's son, 1. The suspect, 18-year-old Matthew Bernard, was arrested after a chase from police, in which he was running around naked. The 25-year-old woman killed was married to Tampa Bay Rays pitcher Blake Bivens, whom they shared the son with.

References

Unincorporated communities in Virginia
Unincorporated communities in Pittsylvania County, Virginia